Krista and Tatiana Hogan (born October 25, 2006) are Canadians who are conjoined craniopagus twins. They are joined at the head and share a brain. They were born in Vancouver, British Columbia, and are the only unseparated conjoined twins of that type currently alive in Canada. They live with their mother, Felicia Simms, in Vernon, British Columbia, have two sisters and a brother and often travel to Vancouver for care at BC Children's Hospital and Sunny Hill Health Centre for Children.

Birth
The twins were given a 20 percent chance of survival at birth. At birth at B.C. Women's Hospital & Health Centre, they were described as "wriggly, vigorous and very vocal". They weighed 12 and a half pounds when they were born by Caesarean section.

Early infant life
Tatiana is smaller and less robust than Krista. Tests on them in April 2007 showed that Tatiana's heart was working harder than Krista's and that she had high blood pressure because of it—Tatiana's heart was supplying part of her blood to Krista's brain. A surgery was planned to give Krista's heart a "jump start" so Tatiana's would not have to work so hard.

The twins' nervous systems are highly interconnected. Their doctors reported that when one of them is tickled, the other jumps, and that putting a pacifier in the mouth of one could cause the other to stop crying.

The twins' birth, potential separation, depth of community support and their family's financial situation have been subject to significant media coverage in Canada. They and their mother were also guests on The Tyra Banks Show in the U.S.

In August 2007, it was declared the twins cannot be separated, due to the likelihood of the surgery killing or paralyzing one or both girls.

The family reduced the twins' public profile due to a contract giving exclusive access to a documentary crew for National Geographic and the Discovery Channel UK. The show was broadcast first in Britain in spring 2010, and then aired in June in Canada and the U.S.

The documentary followed a year in the twins' life and included a "particularly poignant" meeting between the family and Lori and George Schappell, 51, the world’s oldest twins to survive being joined at the head.

There is evidence that the twins can see through each other's eyes due to brain conjoining. Their thalami are joined.

Progression to childhood
In January 2009, a documentary was filmed which reported on the twins, and followed their progress up to their third birthday. This documentary was released and aired in October, 2010. In this documentary, it was confirmed that they share a thalamus which connects their brainstems. Through this shared brain tissue structure and the interconnected neurons, one brain receives signals from the other brain and vice versa. This documentary also reported on experiments that were carried out that confirmed that visual cortex signals based on what one girl saw, were received by both girls' brains. So in effect, one twin could see what the other twin was seeing, making them unique even among craniopagus twins.

At this time, Tatiana suffered from a sleep apnea condition that occasionally caused her to stop breathing for up to 20 seconds. A sleep apnea specialist, Dr. Fred Kozak, surgically treated her sleep apnea. Not long after the surgery, her heart shrank to a more normal size and its rate dropped such that it no longer carried all of the burden of circulating blood for both brains.

The documentary reports that the twins are progressing well, and have achieved all the normal childhood milestones, such as walking, talking, and counting.

A 2014 CBC Radio documentary described how they can feel and taste what the other is experiencing. Later it was also confirmed that they can see through each other's eyes.

See also
Polycephaly
Ladan and Laleh Bijani

References

Further reading

External links
The Twins, Article about the twins at About.com, www.about.com, retrieved on January 27, 2008
Photos: At home with conjoined twins Tatiana and Krista Hogan, Windsor Star, 2014
http://dailygleaner.canadaeast.com/canadaworld/article/458621
 2017 CBC documentary 'Inseparable: Ten Years Joined At The Head'

Conjoined twins
Living people
People from Vernon, British Columbia
Sibling duos
Canadian twins
2006 births